In chemistry, a reaction coordinate is an abstract one-dimensional coordinate which represents progress along a reaction pathway. It is usually a geometric parameter that changes during the conversion of one or more molecular entities. In molecular dynamics simulations, a reaction coordinate is called collective variable.

These coordinates can sometimes represent a real coordinate system (such as bond length, bond angle...), although, for more complex reactions especially, this can be difficult (and non geometric parameters are used, e.g., bond order). Reaction coordinate is distinct from extent of reaction, a different parameter of reaction progress, which is a measure of the composition of the reaction system.

(Free) energy is often plotted against reaction coordinate(s) to demonstrate in some schematic form the potential energy profile (an intersection of a potential energy surface) associated with the reaction.

In the formalism of transition-state theory the reaction coordinate is that coordinate in set of curvilinear coordinates obtained from the conventional ones for the reactants which, for each reaction step, leads smoothly from the configuration of the reactants through that of the transition state to the configuration of the products. The reaction coordinate is typically chosen to follow the path along the gradient (path of shallowest ascent/deepest descent) of potential energy from reactants to products.

For example, in the homolytic dissociation of molecular hydrogen, an apt coordinate system to choose would be the coordinate corresponding to the bond length.

Notes and references

Physical chemistry
Quantum chemistry
Theoretical chemistry
Computational chemistry
Molecular physics
Chemical kinetics